American Heist is a 2014 action drama film directed by Russian director Sarik Andreasyan, based on the 1959 film The Great St. Louis Bank Robbery directed by Charles Guggenheim and John Stix. The film stars Hayden Christensen, Jordana Brewster, Adrien Brody and Akon. It had its world premiere in the Special Presentations section of the 2014 Toronto International Film Festival on September 11, 2014, and was released theatrically in Canada on July 24, 2015, by Mongrel Media.

Plot
James (Hayden Christensen), a man with nothing to lose, owes his life to his older brother Frankie (Adrien Brody), who took the rap for a crime they did together. While Frankie served time, James worked to turn his life around, he manages to get a job as a mechanic, and begins courting his girlfriend Emily (Jordana Brewster), a police dispatcher. Now, Frankie is released and back on the streets and pulls his brother into a heist to serve as wheel man.

Initially James refuses. The heist is planned by Frankie's associates Sugar and Ray whose anti-banking rhetoric, violent streak, and elaborate planning have James unwilling to participate. He instead suggests the brothers break ties and flee.  Frankie is unable to do this because he is indebted to his associates from his time in prison.  During the beginning of his incarceration Frankie admits that he suffered sexual abuse and humiliation until he fell under the protection of Ray and Sugar, and alludes that he would likely not have survived without them.  Frankie also informs James that he had mentioned Emily to them as their friendship developed, and alludes she may be in danger if James does not participate in the heist.  The brothers spend the next few days bonding, and James tearfully ends his relationship with Emily, hoping to put distance between them.

On the morning of the robbery, the crew is met by a fifth member, Spoonie, who helps initiate several distractions around the city.  They then enter the bank planning to gain access to the vault with access codes obtained earlier.  The heist proceeds as planned until an eyewitness walking towards the bank sees Frankie through a window and then notices James parked in a car.  She flees to a nearby store to call the authorities.

As sirens close in, James enters the bank to inform the group that they have less time than planned.  As they begin to move Spoonie is nowhere to be found and it becomes apparent that he had taken the getaway vehicle and fled, stranding them in the bank as police take positions around it.

As the group struggles to come up with a new plan, Frankie initiates a shootout with police, saving James' life and taking a bullet to the abdomen.  As Sugar and Ray lay down suppressing fire, James breaks into a nearby car and hot wires it. The group takes a hostage and makes it to the car, but James returns to the bank when he realizes Frankie is being left behind. He discovers his brother contemplating suicide, and Frankie makes it clear he has no intention of going back to prison.

The brothers stall for time as their associates are gunned down one by one as they flee the police.  Seeing no other way out, Frankie attacks James, renders him unconscious, and proceeds to dress him in the clothes of a hostage.  James regains consciousness just as Frankie exits the bank with him disguised as a hostage.  Emily, working from the police dispatch center, looks on in disbelief as she recognizes a bloody James and unmasked Frankie.  A police sniper kills Frankie on live news and James is ushered into an ambulance, where he attacks the paramedic and discreetly makes an escape in the rain.  As the paramedic regains consciousness and calls it in over the government radio, the call is routed to Emily, who gets up and leaves her work station. James takes a moment to relax while he sits down on a trolley as the film ends.

Cast 
 Hayden Christensen as James Kelly
 Adrien Brody as Frankie Kelly
 Jordana Brewster as Emily
 Akon as Sugar
 Tory Kittles as Ray
 Luis Da Silva Jr. as Spoonie
 Rachel Bilson as eyewitness

Production
Glacier Films produced the film within $10 million range.

Principal photography of the film began in June 2013 in New Orleans, Louisiana.

Box office
American Heist was only screened in 10 theaters in the U.S. and grossed a very small sum: $251, according to The Numbers or $5,800, according to Movie City News, with additional $1,760,247 grossed from home video sales. In Russia and ex-Soviet countries,  the movie had a wider release and grossed more than $2 million, still below the movie's budget of $10,000,000, and is considered a box office bomb.

Reception
American Heist received negative reviews; on Rotten Tomatoes, the film holds a 13% rating based on 15 reviews. According to Metacritic, the film's average critical rating was 23 out of 100. Reception in Russian media was also predominantly negative; according to Kritikanstvo and Megacritic aggregators, Russian critics ranked the movie 3.5 out of 10 on average.

References

External links
 

2014 films
2014 action drama films
2014 action thriller films
2014 crime drama films
2014 crime thriller films
2010s heist films
2014 independent films
2010s prison films
2014 thriller drama films
American action thriller films
American crime action films
American crime thriller films
American independent films
Remakes of American films
Canadian action thriller films
Canadian crime drama films
Canadian crime thriller films
Canadian independent films
2014 crime action films
Films about brothers
Films set in New Orleans
Films shot in New Orleans
Films shot in Toronto
English-language Luxembourgian films
Luxembourgian drama films
Luxembourgian independent films
2010s English-language films
2010s American films
2010s Canadian films